Louise Fredericka of Anhalt-Dessau (1 March 1798 – 11 June 1858) was a member of the House of Ascania and a Princess of Anhalt-Dessau by birth. Through her marriage to Gustav, Landgrave of Hesse-Homburg, Louise became Landgravine consort of Hesse-Homburg from 1846 until 1848.

Family
Princess Louise was born on 1 March 1798 in Dessau as the fifth child and second daughter of Frederick, Hereditary Prince of Anhalt-Dessau and his wife Landgravine Amalie of Hesse-Homburg, daughter of Frederick V, Landgrave of Hesse-Homburg. Princess Louise was a deaf-mute from birth.

Marriage and issue
On 12 February 1818 in Dessau, Louise married her uncle, Gustav, Landgrave of Hesse-Homburg. Gustav was the brother of Louise's mother and the son of Frederick V, Landgrave of Hesse-Homburg and his wife Landgravine Caroline of Hesse-Darmstadt. 

Gustav and Louise had three children:
Princess Caroline (1819–1872); married in 1839 to Henry XX, Prince Reuss of Greiz (1794–1859)
Princess Elisabeth (1823–1864)
Prince Frederick (1830–1848)

Death
Landgrave Gustav died on 8 September 1848 in Bad Homburg. Princess Louise survived her husband by nine years and died on 11 June 1858 in Bad Homburg.

|-

1798 births
1858 deaths
House of Ascania
House of Hesse
Deaf royalty and nobility
German deaf people